Aerosucre S.A. is a cargo airline based in Bogotá, Colombia. It began operation in 1969, and operates scheduled international and domestic cargo services throughout Latin America and the Caribbean. Its home base is El Dorado International Airport, Bogotá.

History

Aerosucre was founded by Juan Carlos Salano Recio in Barranquilla in 1969, and began flight operations as an air taxi company in the spring of 1970, with a Piper PA-28.

By the spring of 1975, the company was focused primarily on freight transport, although it was still allowed to carry a maximum of five passengers on the flights. Initially, the company flew to the Colombian island of San Andrés and internationally to the islands of Aruba and Curaçao.

In 1981, Aerosucre acquired two Handley Page Heralds from British Air Ferries. Its first jet aircraft, a Sud Aviation Caravelle, was purchased in August 1982, from Spanish company Transeuropa.

On March 5, 1996,  of cocaine paste were discovered on an Aerosucre airplane in Leticia, Colombia, concealed among  of fish.

By 2020, the company participates in the transportation of medical supplies throughout Colombia in support of the medical response to the COVID-19 pandemic.

Destinations
Aerosucre operates to the following destinations:

Fleet

Current fleet
, the Aerosucre fleet consists of these aircraft:

Former fleet

Aerosucre has operated these aircraft in the past:

1 Beechcraft 1900C
3 Boeing 727-100F
4 Curtiss C-46 Commando
1 Douglas DC-4
5 Douglas DC-6B
2 Handley Page Herald
1 Piper PA-28
8 Sud Aviation Caravelle

Safety
The safety culture at Aerosucre has been called into question by airline industry analysts following a number of accidents and incidents involving the airline, along with videos that have appeared on the internet that showcase reckless behavior by Aerosucre pilots. In 1995, the company was cited by the Colombian government for flying at weights above their planes' specified maximum takeoff weights, and in 2005, inspectors found two planes flying while more than  overweight. Excess weight was also cited as a factor in the fatal crash of Aerosucre Flight 157 in 2016. Aerosucre has had a history of transporting passengers despite being unauthorized to do so by the Colombian government. Following a June 20, 1991, crash that killed two, passengers reported that they had been forced to lie down on the floor of the plane, because the aircraft had no seats.

Accidents and incidents
On September 16, 1976, a Curtiss C-46 Commando (registered HK-1282) disappeared without a trace on a cargo flight from Barranquilla to Oranjestad. Two crew members were on board.
On March 13, 1984, during an apparently illegal flight, a Curtiss C-46 Commando (registered HK-1322P) was forced by air traffic control to return to Barranquilla. The plane crashed upon landing, killing four of the six occupants aboard.
On November 27, 1986, a Sud Aviation Caravelle (registered HK-2850) aborted takeoff from Arauca, Colombia, due to control problems. The aircraft overran the runway and crashed into a ditch. No deaths resulted, although the plane was a total loss.
On April 26, 1989, a Sud Aviation Caravelle (registered HK-3325X) crashed into an inhabited area shortly after taking off from Barranquilla. All five crew members were killed, along with two people on the ground. The cause was poorly secured cargo, which shifted during takeoff, causing the aircraft to stall.
On November 5, 1989, a Handley Page Herald 401 (registered HK-2702) en route from Bogotá to Cali crashed into a mountain near the town of Roncesvalles, Tolima, during poor weather. All six occupants were killed.
On June 20, 1991, a Douglas DC-6B (registered HK-3511X) crashed on its second attempt at landing at Barranquilla, killing two and injuring 20 of the 25 passengers on board.
On September 29, 1991, a Sud Aviation Caravelle (registered HK-3288X) had its landing gear fail during takeoff, causing it to veer off the runway. All crew members occupants survived.
On May 1, 1995, a Boeing 727-200F (registered HK-1717) descended below the glide slope on approach to Taguatinga Airport, Brazil, touching down  before the runway threshold. 
On June 25, 1997, the same aircraft, HK-1717, crossed the threshold of runway 31 at El Dorado International Airport in Bogotá, after having aborted takeoff. All occupants were unharmed, but the aircraft was declared a total loss and later dismantled.
On August 17, 2006, a Boeing 727-200F (registered HK-3985) suffered a landing-gear failure during taxi at El Dorado International Airport in Bogotá, resulting in damage to its left wing. The aircraft was declared a total loss and was dismantled.
On November 18, 2006, a Boeing 727-200F (registered HK-3667X) on a cargo flight from Bogotá to Leticia crashed on approach to Leticia when it hit a  television antenna. The three crew members and two passengers were killed.
On February 12, 2011, a Boeing 727-200F carrying cargo from Yopal to Mitú experienced a hydraulic failure while flying over Bogotá. The plane landed safely at El Dorado International Airport in Bogotá, and no one was injured.
On December 20, 2016, Aerosucre Flight 157, a Boeing 727-200F (registered HK-4544) crashed after takeoff from Germán Olano Airport in Puerto Carreño. The aircraft overran the runway, hit the fence, and eventually became airborne, climbing out, but then crashed while attempting to return for an emergency landing. Five crew members died; one crew member suffered severe injuries.
On April 26, 2019, a Boeing 737-200F (registered HK-5026) veered off the runway while landing in poor weather at Bogotá. The crew was able to recover and bring the aircraft back on to the runway.
On 21 August 2021, a Boeing 737-230F (registered HK-5026) had to make an emergency landing back to Mitú, since the cargo door had opened in flight after taking off from Mitú.

See also
List of airlines of Colombia

References

External links

Airlines of Colombia
Airlines established in 1969
Cargo airlines
Colombian companies established in 1969
Companies of Colombia